Thomas Aubrey Chappé Hall (16 June 1873 – 21 May 1958) was a New Zealand wood carver and farmer. He was born in Ruddington, Nottinghamshire, England on 16 June 1873. His wife was Margaret Louise Chappé de Leonval. He attended Leamington and Tonbridge.

References

1873 births
1958 deaths
New Zealand farmers
English emigrants to New Zealand
People from Ruddington